Warzone is the fifth studio album by American death metal band Jungle Rot, released through Crash Music, Inc. on May 27, 2006.

Track listing

Personnel 
David Matrise: Guitar/Vocals
James Genenz: Bass Guitar/Backing Vocal
Geoff Bub: Guitar
Neil Zacharek: Drums
Chris "Wisco" Djuricic: Producer
Jeromy Boutwell: Graphic Design

References

2006 albums
Jungle Rot albums